The Spring Cup was an international darts competition contested by nations from continental Europe which ran from 1986 to 2012. It was run by the European Darts Council and featured singles and team events for men and women.

History 
Held annually since 1986, the Spring Cup was run by the European Darts Council. It was the third largest competition for European nations behind the WDF World Cup and WDF Europe Cup. The competition was referred to as the 'small' Europe Cup since there were only singles and team events held for men and women.

Only the nations from continental Europe were allowed to enter. Established darting nations such as England, Scotland, Wales, Northern Ireland and Republic of Ireland were excluded so 'smaller' less established nations had a chance at success. There was no competition held in 1989 or 2002, but the 2009 edition was cancelled. The 2012 edition was the last. After some speculation, it was announced the competition would not return in 2013 as there were not enough countries willing to enter the competition.

The men's and women's singles events, held on the last day, are also individual tournaments which offer both winners entry in to the qualifying rounds for the World Masters.

Competing nations 
The following is a list of nations that had previously entered the Spring Cup;

 Austria
 Belgium
 Catalonia
 Czech Republic
 Denmark
 France
 Germany
 Hungary
 Luxembourg
 Netherlands
 Slovenia
 Spain
 Switzerland

Winners

References

External links 
Spring Cup Men's Roll of Honour Darts Database.

1986 establishments in Europe
2012 disestablishments in Europe
Darts tournaments